Højby is a Danish town, seat of the Odsherred Municipality, in the Region Sjælland. Its population on 1 January 2022 was 1,422.

Geography
Højby is located in the north-central side of the Zealand island.

Notable people
 Nielsine Petersen (1851 in Nyrup – 1916) a Danish sculptor
 Ib Nielsen (1919 in Højby – 1994) a Danish fencer, competed at the 1948 and 1952 Summer Olympics
 Gerhardt Sørensen (1921 in Højby – 2002), Olympic rower, competed at the London 1948 Summer Olympics
 Mark Haastrup (born 1984 in Højby) is a Danish professional golfer
 Stina Lykke Petersen (born 1986 in Højby) a Danish football goalkeeper who plays for Danish club Kolding Q and the Denmark women's national football team

See also 
 Højby Church

References

External links

Municipal seats of Region Zealand
Municipal seats of Denmark
Cities and towns in Region Zealand
Odsherred Municipality
Populated places in Funen